The Women's Heptathlon at the 2011 World Championships in Athletics was held at the Daegu Stadium on 29 and 30 August.

Before the competition, reigning champion Jessica Ennis was top of the year's heptathlon rankings (6790 points) and was closely followed by Tatyana Chernova who had set a personal best. The 2009 silver medallist Jennifer Oeser was also in good form while Nataliya Dobrynska and Hyleas Fountain (first and second at the 2008 Olympics) were the other high-profile competitors. Tatyana Chernova won the gold medal finishing 129 points ahead of Jessica Ennis.

Hyleas Fountain started the event powerfully, looking like she was in it to win it.  She squeezed out a .02 victory in the 100 metres hurdles and added a 3 cm advantage in the high jump, just a centimeter below her personal best, to give her a 39-point lead.  Then things began to unravel.  She gave up over 2 metres in the Shot put, where defending champion Jessica Ennis and returning silver medalist Tatyana Chernova powered through.  Chernova was gaining from the beginning of the second day with a 10 cm advantage in the long jump.  But the real break occurred when Chernova gained exactly 13 metres on Ennis in the javelin, a 250-point swing.  Jennifer Oeser used her strong javelin throw to place herself firmly in third.  Karolina Tyminska in fourth and Ennis tried to run themselves into an advanced position in the 800 metres.  While Tyminska won the 800, Oeser was able to stay close enough to her to hold on to the bronze.  Ennis was just 2.6 seconds behind Tyminska, but Chernova would not let Ennis gain even a quarter of a second, much less the gold medal. On 29 November 2016 the IAAF stripped Chernova of the title, as well as many of her others, due to doping and the results were adjusted accordingly.

With only two non-finishers, this edition of the women's heptathlon is notable for having the lowest fraction of athletes not finishing the competition in the World Championships history.

Medalists  

 Following disqualification of Tatyana Chernova, .  Ennis and Oeser, but not Tymińska, attended the medal ceremony, held at the 2017 World Championships on 4 August 2017.

Records 
Prior to the competition, the established records were as follows.

Qualification standards

Schedule

Results

100 metres hurdles 
Wind:Heat 1: +0.4 m/s, Heat 2: +0.9 m/s, Heat 3: +1.6 m/s, Heat 4: +1.7 m/s

High jump

Shot put

200 metres 
Wind:Heat 1: -1.5 m/s, Heat 2: -1.2 m/s, Heat 3: -1.1 m/s, Heat 4: -1.3 m/s

Long jump

Javelin throw

800 metres

Final standings

References

External links 
 Heptathlon results at IAAF website

Heptathlon
Heptathlon at the World Athletics Championships
2011 in women's athletics